Amos Henry Radcliffe (January 16, 1870 - December 29, 1950) was an American Republican politician who represented New Jersey's 7th congressional district, serving two terms in office from March 4, 1919, to March 3, 1923.

Early life and education
Radcliffe was born in Paterson, New Jersey, on January 16, 1870. He attended the Paterson Public Schools, and graduated from the New York Trade School. Radcliffe served as a  sergeant in the New Jersey National Guard from 1888-1893.

Early career
He became a blacksmith and ornamental and structural ironworker. In 1896 became associated with his father's firm and in 1907 was made secretary of James Radcliffe & Sons Co., a structural iron manufacturing company.

Radcliffe was a member of the New Jersey General Assembly from 1907-1912. He served as a delegate to the Republican State conventions in 1910, 1911, and 1912, was sheriff of Passaic County from 1912 to 1915 and was fish and game commissioner from 1914 to 1919. Radcliffe served as Mayor of Paterson, New Jersey, from 1916 to 1919.

Congress
Radcliffe was elected as a Republican to the Sixty-sixth and Sixty-seventh Congresses, serving in office from March 4, 1919, to March 3, 1923, but was an unsuccessful candidate for reelection in 1922 to the Sixty-eighth Congress.

Later career and death
After leaving Congress, he resumed active interests in Radcliffe & Sons Company and was treasurer at the time of his death. he was the founder and a former president of the Franklin Trust Company, of Paterson, and served as chairman of the board.

In 1925, he became a member of the Board of Standards and Appeals in Paterson. He died in Balesville, New Jersey, on December 29, 1950, and was interred in Cedar Lawn Cemetery in Paterson.

References

External links

The Political Graveyard profile for Amos Henry Radcliffe

Republican Party members of the New Jersey General Assembly
1870 births
1950 deaths
Mayors of Paterson, New Jersey
Republican Party members of the United States House of Representatives from New Jersey
Burials at Cedar Lawn Cemetery